is a former Japanese football player and manager and current manager of Japan Football League club Maruyasu Okazaki.

Playing career
Ibata was born in Sapporo on June 25, 1974. After graduating from high school, he joined Nagoya Grampus Eight in 1994. However he could not play at all in the match until 1996. In 1996, he moved to Honda. He played many matches and he also scored 11 goals in 1999. In 2000, he moved to JEF United Ichihara. Although he played many matches in 2000, his opportunity to play decreased in 2001 and retired end of 2001 season.

Coaching career
He coached high school and university team until 2012. In 2013, he signed with Zweigen Kanazawa and became a manager for youth team. In 2014, Ibata became a manager for Honda.

Club statistics

References

External links

helvetica.mods.jp

1974 births
Living people
Association football people from Hokkaido
Japanese footballers
J1 League players
Japan Football League (1992–1998) players
Japan Football League players
Nagoya Grampus players
Honda FC players
JEF United Chiba players
Japanese football managers
Association football midfielders
Sportspeople from Sapporo